The following is a list of films produced by the Art Theatre Guild company of Japan.

Films produced by Art Theatre Guild

References

Filmographies
Lists of films by studio